Fund for the Replacement of Animals in Medical Experiments (FRAME) is a charity based in Nottingham, UK. FRAME promotes consideration of the ethical and scientific issues involved in the use of laboratory animals for medical research, and the adoption of the Three Rs strategy of alternatives to animal testing.

The Three Rs 

The Three Rs (Replacement, Reduction, Refinement) strategy was first suggested by zoologist William Russell and microbiologist Rex Burch, with Replacement being the ultimate goal.  FRAME campaigns for the replacement of animal testing methods with alternatives that do not use animals.  If there is no valid alternative, FRAME believes the number of animals involved should be reduced as far as possible, and the procedures applied should be refined to minimise potential pain and distress.

The FRAME research programme involves both office-based and laboratory-based research. Staff at the Nottingham city offices and the FRAME Alternatives Laboratory at The University of Nottingham Medical School work to find ways in which the use of laboratory animals can be replaced with procedures which employ alternative methods such as cells in culture, computer-based approaches and ethical studies on human cells, tissues and volunteers. Research funded by FRAME has contributed to reducing the number of animals used in research and testing.

History 

FRAME was founded by Dorothy Hegarty, who was introduced to the Three Rs by the biologist Charles Foister. It was registered as a UK charity in 1969. FRAME had a starting fund of £100 and was first based in a room in the Hegarty house in Wimbledon, London. Eventually, money from donations provided a salary for a secretary. Soon, enough funds were available for FRAME to rent a shop in Worple Rd, Raynes Park, London where it was based for almost a decade.

1978 - FRAME held a symposium at the Royal Society on the Use of Alternatives in Drug Research.

1981 - Michael Balls became Chairman of the FRAME trustees and FRAME moved to Nottingham. Soon after, a research programme and links with the University of Nottingham were established.

1979 - The FRAME Toxicity Committee presented its first report on alternatives to using animals for toxicity testing at the Animals and Alternatives in Toxicity Testing conference, organised by FRAME, and held at the Royal Society in 1982.
 
1983 - ATLA (Alternatives to Laboratory Animals) relaunched With the help of funding from the Maurice Laing Foundation. ATLA, formerly a pamphlet style publication, was relaunched as a peer-reviewed international scientific journal.

1983 - FRAME joined with the British Veterinary Association (BVA) and the Committee for the Reform of Animal Experimentation (CRAE) to advise the government on the Animals (Scientific Procedures) Act. 
 
1984 - FRAME receives first ever government grant to research replacement methods

1986 - FRAME expanded into new premises on the 1st floor of Eastgate House in the historic Lace Market area of Nottingham. In the same year, FRAME received the first Marchig Animal Welfare Award from the World Society for the Protection of Animals (Now known as World Animal Protection). The following year, Michael Balls became one of the founder members of the Animals Procedures Committee.

1989 - INVITTOX, a collection of protocols for in vitro methods in toxicology, was established. This database is now part of ECVAM's Scientific Information Service.

1991 - The FRAME Alternatives Laboratory (FAL) opened to conduct research into alternatives.

1995 - The FRAME office relocated to the newly built Russell & Burch House, Nottingham.

1998 - FRAME became a founder member of Focus on Alternatives. This body promotes dialogue between all UK groups that focus on replacement alternatives.

1999 - Bill Russell delivered the first annual FRAME Lecture at the Royal Society of Medicine. In 2005, the Annual Lecture was renamed the Bill Annett Lecture in memory of Bill Annett, and in recognition of his lifelong commitment to FRAME.

2000-2003 - EU regulators accepted the first three replacement alternatives to animal-based toxicity testing. One of these, a phototoxicity test, had been validated in a 1997 study that involved the FAL.

2007 - The new FRAME Alternatives Laboratory opened at the University of Nottingham Medical School.

2013 - Dr Anna Cadogan took over as Acting Chair of Trustees following the resignation of Professor Michael Balls.

Funding 
FRAME receives no direct funding from local or central government and relies entirely on donations, legacies and corporate support. A list of its current corporate supporters is available in its annual report each year.

References

Bibliography 
 William Russell and Rex Burch (1959) The Principles of Humane Experimental Technique. London: Methuen.  (paperback edition)

External links 

 Animals (Scientific Procedures) Act 1986
 Charities Commission overview

Animal charities based in the United Kingdom
Animal welfare organisations based in the United Kingdom
Alternatives to animal testing
Anti-vivisection organizations
Charities based in Nottinghamshire
Organisations based in Nottingham